Stephen Smith (born 25 March 1973 in New Zealand) is a former Manu Samoa and North Harbour rugby player from New Zealand.

Smith made his international debut for  against  in 1995 at Murrayfield Stadium. He made his last appearance against  in 1999.

References

External links
ESPN Scrum Profile

1973 births
Living people
New Zealand rugby union players
North Harbour rugby union players
Samoa international rugby union players
Rugby union locks